Dominique Le Mèner (born 12 November 1958) is a French politician.  He has been the president of the Sarthe departmental council since 2 April 2015.
He was a member of the National Assembly of France, representing Sarthe's 5th constituency from 2002 to 2017, as a member of the Union for a Popular Movement, then The Republicans.

References

1958 births
Living people
Union for a Popular Movement politicians
Deputies of the 12th National Assembly of the French Fifth Republic
Deputies of the 13th National Assembly of the French Fifth Republic
Deputies of the 14th National Assembly of the French Fifth Republic